The ITU School of Naval Architecture and Ocean Engineering was founded as an individual department in School of Mechanical Engineering in 1943. It was reorganized in 1971 as a separate school. Faculty has its own library in addition to Mustafa Inan Library.

The faculty has two departments today:
 Naval architecture and marine engineering
 Ocean engineering

References

External links 
 ITU School of Naval Architecture and Ocean Engineering, Official website
 Faculty bulletin, Turkish
 Muavenet

Istanbul Technical University
Marine engineering organizations